CM1, CM-1 or cm−1 may refer to:

The Chelmsford postcode area
Bowers & Wilkins (B&W) CM1 loudspeaker
A primary school grade in the French educational system
Cooking Mama, the first game in the Cooking Mama series
Cake Mania, the first game in the Cake Mania series
The Panasonic Lumix DMC-CM1 smartphone
 Connection Machine Model 1, a parallel computer
 USS Baltimore (CM-1), a United States warship

In the form cm−1, it may refer to:
 Inverse centimetre, unit of measurement: see Reciprocal length